Sir William Brampton Gurdon  (5 September 1840 – 31 May 1910) was a British civil servant who became a Liberal Party politician.

Early life 
Gurdon was the youngest son of Brampton Gurdon (MP for West Norfolk) of Letton, Norfolk and his wife Henrietta Susanna, daughter of the 1st Baron Colborne.  He was educated at Eton and at Trinity College, Cambridge, where he graduated in 1863 with a BA degree. His elder brother, Robert, would also enter politics and served as an MP 1880-1895.

Career 
Gurdon entered the Treasury as a clerk in 1863, and became private secretary to William Ewart Gladstone when he was Chancellor of the Exchequer from 1865 to 1866 and when Prime Minister from 1868 to 1874. In 1879 he served as a special commissioner in South Africa following the Anglo-Zulu War, and then in 1881 on the Royal Commission appointed to draw up the Pretoria Convention.

Parliament 
At the 1885 general election Gurdon stood unsuccessfully in South West Norfolk. He was unsuccessful again at Rotherhithe in 1886 and in Colchester at a by-election in 1888.

He finally entered Parliament on his fourth attempt, when he was elected at a by-election in March 1899 as the Member of Parliament (MP) for North Norfolk. He held the seat for 11 years, until he stood down at the January 1910 general election. His major achievement as an MP was successfully bringing the Deceased Wife's Sister's Marriage Act 1907 through Parliament; this had been a controversial proposal for over seventy years. 

He was also a Justice of the Peace (JP) for Suffolk, and a member of East Suffolk County Council. He was sworn as a Privy Counsellor in July 1907, and became Lord Lieutenant of Suffolk in October 1907.

Personal life 
In 1888 he married Lady Eveline Camilla Wallop, daughter of the 5th Earl of Portsmouth. She died in 1894. There is a memorial to them both in the church of St Edmund in Assington, Suffolk.

References

External links 
 

1840 births
1911 deaths
Liberal Party (UK) MPs for English constituencies
UK MPs 1895–1900
UK MPs 1900–1906
UK MPs 1906–1910
Members of East Suffolk County Council
Companions of the Order of the Bath
English justices of the peace
Knights Commander of the Order of St Michael and St George
People educated at Eton College
Alumni of Trinity College, Cambridge
Lord-Lieutenants of Suffolk
Members of the Privy Council of the United Kingdom